The 2015 Emami Kolkata Open ATP Challenger Tour was a professional tennis tournament played on hard courts. It was the 2nd edition of tournament which was part of the 2015 ATP Challenger Tour. It took place in Kolkata, India between 23 and 28 February 2015.

Singles main-draw entrants

Seeds

 1 Rankings are as of 16 February 2015

Other entrants
The following players received wildcards into the singles main draw:
  Jeevan Nedunchezhiyan
  Sanam Singh
  Sumit Nagal
  Prajnesh Gunneswaran

The following players received entry from the qualifying draw:
  Richard Becker
  Vijay Sundar Prashanth
  Kevin Krawietz
  Vinayak Sharma Kaza

Champions

Singles

 Radu Albot def.  James Duckworth, 7–6(7–0), 6–1

Doubles

 Somdev Devvarman /  Jeevan Nedunchezhiyan def.  James Duckworth /  Luke Saville by walkover

References
 Combined Main Draw

External links
Official Website

Emami Kolkata Open ATP Challenger Tour
Emami Kolkata Open ATP Challenger Tour
2015 in Indian tennis